Scirpophaga percna is a moth in the family Crambidae. It was described by Ian Francis Bell Common in 1960. It is found on Sulawesi, on New Guinea and northern Australia, where it has been recorded from the Northern Territory and Queensland.

The wingspan is 22–25 mm for males and 24–37 mm for females.

The larvae feed on Saccharum species and possibly Eleocharis dulcis. They bore into the stems of their host plant.

References

Moths described in 1960
Schoenobiinae
Moths of Indonesia
Moths of Australia
Moths of New Guinea